Uvaria grandiflora is an Asian liana species in the family Annonaceae and tribe Uvarieae.  Its native range includes: China, Indochina, Malesia and New Guinea.

References

External Links 
 
 
 Catalogue of Life entry: (retrieved 29 July 2021)

Annonaceae
Flora of Indo-China
Flora of Malesia